Kheragarh is a town and a nagar panchayat in Agra district in the Indian state of Uttar Pradesh. The distance of the town from Agra is 40 kilometers.

Demographics
 India census,<ref>{url=https://censusindia.gov.in/pca/SearchDetails.aspx}
Kheragarh had a population of 33,045. Males constitute 54% of the population and females 46%. Kheragarh has an average literacy rate of 65.68%, lower than the national average of 74%: male literacy is 59.3%, and female literacy is 40.7%. In Kheragarh, 14.75% of the population is under 6 years of age.

River
Kheragarh is situated on the bank of river Utangan. Which merges with Parvati and Chambal rivers.

References

Cities and towns in Agra district